Mahmeleh (also Romanized as Maḩmeleh; also known as Makhmaleh, Mohīleh, and Mūhīmīleh) is a village in Mahmeleh Rural District, Mahmeleh District, Khonj County, Fars Province, Iran. At the 2006 census, its population was 537, in 126 families.

References 

Populated places in Khonj County